Babadan Station (station code: BBD) is a third-class railway station in Dimong, Madiun, Madiun Regency, East Java, Indonesia, operated by Kereta Api Indonesia. This railway station is at the most southwestern railway station in Madiun Regency. This station's new building is operated—which has four tracks (two main lines and two passing tracks)—since Nganjuk–Babadan double track segment activation on 30 April 2019 and Babadan–Geneng on 16 October 2019.

Services 
This railway station has no train services except for train overtaking.

Gallery

References

External links 

 Kereta Api Indonesia - Indonesian railway company

Madiun Regency
Railway stations in East Java